"Elvira" is a song written and originally recorded by Dallas Frazier in 1966 on his album of the same name.  Though a minor hit for Frazier at the time of release, the song became a bigger and much more famous country and pop hit by The Oak Ridge Boys in 1981. "Elvira" is now considered one of the Oak Ridge Boys' signature songs.

Song history
Songwriter Dallas Frazier wrote "Elvira" in 1966 and included it as the title track of an album he released that year. The title of the song was inspired not by the name of a woman, but by the name of a street in East Nashville, Tennessee. The song's chorus bears a resemblance to the song "Searchin" written by Jerry Leiber and Mike Stoller and recorded famously by the Coasters.

Frazier's version peaked at No. 72 on the Billboard Hot 100, and was a top 40 hit in Canada, reaching No. 27. A number of other artists recorded the song through the years with varying degrees of success, most notably Kenny Rogers and the First Edition. Rogers' version appeared on the album Something's Burning, which reached the top 30 of the Billboard 200. In 1978, alternative country recording artist Rodney Crowell recorded his cover of "Elvira" (with "Ashes by Now" on the B-side). Crowell's version hit No. 95 on Billboard's country chart.

Cover versions

Rodney Crowell version

In 1978, twelve years after Frazier's original version, Country singer Rodney Crowell covered the song and released it as his debut single on Warner Bros. Nashvile and Reprise Records, and later appearing on his debut studio album Ain't Living Long Like This. Crowell's version peaked at 95 on the Billboard Hot Country Songs chart. Crowell's version also served as an inspiration for the Oak Ridge Boys' version.

The Oak Ridge Boys recording

The Oak Ridge Boys, who were fans of Rodney Crowell's version of "Elvira", decided to include the song on their 1981 album Fancy Free. Duane Allen said when Frazier played the song on WSM (AM) in 1966 "I heard it once and never forgot it. That's when you know a song is a hit." Their rendition featured Joe Bonsall on lead vocals, as well as bass singer Richard Sterban's deep-voiced vocal solo on the chorus ("oom papa oom papa oom papa mow mow"), which producer Ron Chancey of MCA Records suggested. Allen said, ""We wanted 'Elvira' to be a summer record for families of four .... Mom's singing the verses, the kids sing the 'giddy up' hook, and dad comes in with the 'oom papa' chorus. It's the best planning we ever did." "Elvira" quickly climbed the Billboard Hot Country Singles chart, and over Memorial Day weekend it became the group's fourth number one country hit. It was also their biggest pop hit, reaching number one on the Cashbox Top 100 on August 1, and peaking at number five on the Billboard Hot 100 that July and August. 

"Elvira" was certified platinum for sales of two million units by the Recording Industry Association of America, a distinction for a country song that for years it shared only with "Islands in the Stream" by Kenny Rogers and Dolly Parton.

Single and album edits 
The single version fades out after the first key change, more than a minute earlier than the album version (which features two more key changes and "oom pa-pa mow mow" choruses).

Re-recordings 

The group has re-recorded the song several times since its original release.

In 2009, a live version was released on the group's "A Gospel Journey" DVD and CD. This version includes a guest appearance from Tim Duncan on bass vocals for one line.

In 2011, in recognition of the 30th anniversary of the group's original recording, a new version was recorded and released on "It's Only Natural", an album released exclusively through Cracker Barrel Old Country Store. The new version was produced by the original's producer, Ron Chancey.

Also in 2011, a version was recorded with the Dukes of Dixieland for their "When Country Meets Dixie" album.

Another live version was released on the Oak Ridge Boys' 2014 live album, "Boys Night Out."

In 2015, the Oak Ridge Boys recorded the song with a cappella group Home Free on their album Country Evolution.

In 2017, the group recorded a live-in-the-studio version with Blake Shelton as a Spotify exclusive release.

In  2018, the group wrote a variation of "Elvira", in collaboration with the Tennessee Titans, named Titans Code of Conduct. Although the lyrics were drastically changed, the melody stays the same.

Chart history

Weekly charts

Year-end charts

Dallas Frazier

Rodney Crowell

The Oak Ridge Boys

References

Works cited
Whitburn, Joel, "Top Country Songs: 1944–2005," 2006.
Whitburn, Joel, "Top Pop Singles: 1955–2006," 2007.

1966 songs
The Oak Ridge Boys songs
Rodney Crowell songs
MCA Records singles
Capitol Records singles
Reprise Records singles
Warner Records Nashville singles
Cashbox number-one singles
Songs written by Dallas Frazier
Song recordings produced by Ron Chancey
1981 singles